Embracing Defeat: Japan in the Wake of World War II is a history book written by John W. Dower and published by W. W. Norton & Company in 1999.  The book  covers the difficult social, economic, cultural and political situation of Japan in the aftermath of World War II and the nation's occupation by the Allies between August 1945 and April 1952, delving into topics such as the administration of Douglas MacArthur, the Tokyo war crimes trials, Hirohito's controversial Humanity Declaration and the drafting of the new Constitution of Japan.

Described by The New York Times as "magisterial and beautifully written," the book won the 2000 Pulitzer Prize for General Non-Fiction, the 1999 National Book Award, the 2000 Bancroft Prize, the 2000 L.L. Winship/PEN New England Award, the Mark Lynton History Prize and the 1999 Los Angeles Times Book Prize.

Publication

 Total pages: 676.

See also
Empire of Japan
Japanese resistance during the Shōwa period

References

External links

First Chapter
Interview with Dower on Embracing Defeat, Booknotes, March 26, 2000

History books about World War II
Books about Japan
Occupied Japan
Pulitzer Prize for General Non-Fiction-winning works
National Book Award for Nonfiction winning works
1999 non-fiction books
W. W. Norton & Company books
Bancroft Prize-winning works